The Gothic Earth Gazetteer is an accessory for the 2nd edition of the Advanced Dungeons & Dragons fantasy role-playing game, published in 1995.

Contents
Following the timeline is a closer examination of the events of the Spanish–American War. Some events are dealt with in detail, including the Dreyfus Affair and the murder of the Sioux at Wounded Knee, and the history is accompanied by proposed supernatural explanations. The biographical section employs a similar approach, with some of the notable people of the period given fictional enhancements (artist Paul Cézanne is blessed with a "spiritual parasite", for example), and the section includes a few fictional characters such as Sherlock Holmes. The accessory finishes with accounts of the more significant . The accessory is bound in a color poster calendar.

Publication history
The Gothic Earth Gazetteer was designed by William W. Connors, and published by TSR in 1995.  The cover artist was Robh Ruppel, with interior art courtesy of and used with permission of Dover Publications, Inc.

Reception
Cliff Ramshaw reviewed The Gothic Earth Gazetteer for Arcane magazine, rating it a 5 out of 10 overall. Ramshaw called the accessory "something very much like a history book, but with make-believe bits thrown in for good measure". He commented that the timeline "makes for interesting reading and is, dare I say it, educational, despite its peculiar emphasis on American baseball achievements". He felt that the Spanish–American War description would give referees plenty of ideas for espionage adventures, despite no overt hints given. He considered the accounts of the significant  "lacklustre". Ramshaw concluded by saying: "The Gazetteer is nicely presented and quite intriguing, but you're likely to unearth much more in the way of atmosphere and ideas by reading a few history books and period novels."

References

Ravenloft supplements
Role-playing game supplements introduced in 1995